Wahidi Habban, or the Wahidi Sultanate of Habban in Hadhramaut, was one of several Wahidi states in the British Aden Protectorate.  Its capital was Habban. The last sultan, Husayn ibn Abd Allah Al Wahidi, was deposed and the state was abolished in 1967 upon the founding of the People's Republic of South Yemen. The area is now part of the Republic of Yemen.

History
The predecessor state, the Wahidi Sultanate (Saltanat al-Wahidiyya), was established at an uncertain date.
In 1830 the Wahidi Sultanate split into four states: 
 Wahidi Sultanate of Ba´l Haf (Saltanat Ba al-Haf al-Wahidiyya) 
 Wahidi Sultanate of `Azzan (Saltanat `Azzan al-Wahidiyya) 
 Wahidi Sultanate of Bi´r `Ali `Amaqin  (Saltanat Bi'r `Ali `Amaquin al-Wahidiyya) 
 Wahidi Sultanate of Habban (Saltanat Habban al-Wahidiyya) 
On 4 May 1881 Ba´l Haf and `Azzan joined. In 1888 the Wahidi Sultanate of Ba´l Haf and `Azzan became a British protectorate. 
In 1895 Bi´r `Ali `Amaqin also came under British protection. On 23 Oct 1962 the joint sultanate was renamed Wahidi Sultanate (al-Saltana al-Wahidiyya), while Bi´r `Ali and Habban remained subordinate sultanates. 
On 29 Nov 1967 with the independence of the People's Republic of South Yemen all states were abolished.

Rulers
The Sultans of the Wahidi Sultanate of Habban had the style of Sultan Habban al-Wahidi.

Sultans
1830 - 1840                al-Husayn ibn Ahmad al-Wahidi 
1850 - 1870                `Abd Allah ibn al-Husayn al-Wahidi  
1870 - 1877                Ahmad ibn al-Husayn al-Wahidi 
1877 - May 1881            Salih ibn Ahmad al-Wahidi 
May 1881 - Jan 1885        Interregnum  
Jan 1885 - 1919            Nasir ibn Salih al-Wahidi 
1919 - 19..                al-Husayn ibn `Ali al-Wahidi 
c.1962 - 23 Oct 1962       al-Husayn ibn `Abd Allah al-Wahidi (continued as subordinate ruler until 29 Nov 1967)

See also
Aden Protectorate

References

External links
Map of Arabia (1905-1923) including the states of Aden Protectorate
Historical Flags of Yemen

19th-century establishments in Yemen
States in the Aden Protectorate
Former sultanates